Collantes is a Spanish surname. Notable people with the surname include:

Florentino Collantes (1896–1951), Filipino poet
Francisco Collantes (1599–1656), Spanish Baroque painter
Juan José Collantes (born 1983), Spanish footballer
Manuel Collantes (died 2009), Filipino diplomat
Sonny Collantes, Filipino politician

Spanish-language surnames